The 2018 Grand Prix of Portland was the 16th And penultimate round of the 2018 IndyCar Series season. The race was held on September 2 at Portland International Raceway, in Portland, Oregon. 2018 Indy 500 champion Will Power qualified on pole position, while 2017 Indy 500 champion Takuma Sato took victory in the 105-lap race.

Results

Qualifying

Race 

Notes:
 Points include 1 point for leading at least 1 lap during a race, an additional 2 points for leading the most race laps, and 1 point for Pole Position.

Championship standings after the race 

Drivers' Championship standings

Manufacturer standings

 Note: Only the top five positions are included.

References 

Grand Prix of Portland
Grand Prix of Portland
Grand Prix of Portland
Grand Prix of Portland